WKDD (98.1 FM) is a commercial radio station licensed to Munroe Falls, Ohio, United States, featuring a hot adult contemporary format known as "98.1 KDD". Owned by iHeartMedia, Inc., the station serves both the Akron-Canton metro area, with additional coverage in Greater Cleveland and much of surrounding Northeast Ohio. WKDD's studios are located in North Canton, while the transmitter is located in Cuyahoga Falls. In addition to a standard analog transmission, WKDD broadcasts over two HD Radio channels, and streams online via iHeartRadio.

History

WTOF / WTOF-FM
In 1960, Edwin Mortenson moved to Canton, Ohio and began construction on a new 50,000-watt FM radio station: WTOF at 98.1 megahertz (MHz). Mortenson had tired of losing his radio ministry whenever a new station owner would come along and flip his affiliate's format; he resolved to build his own radio station to keep his religious shows on the air – WTOF-FM was that station. Broadcasting a Christian format under the name "Tower of Faith" (the origin of the "WTOF" call letters), the station served the Canton area for decades, and was just the first of several stations to come under Mortenson's ownership – the start of Mortenson Broadcasting. In 1985, the station changed its callsign to WTOF-FM after briefly owning WTOF (900 AM).

WHK-FM (98.1)

In 1997, Mortenson opted to sell off WTOF-FM, and Akron-licensed station WHLO (640 AM), to California-based Salem Communications; soon the West Coast firm would change the station's callsign to WHK-FM. Salem had already purchased WHK (1420 AM) the previous year and flipped its format from news/talk to religious programming; the new WHK-FM would simulcast its sister station's content for the next few years.

During this time, nationally syndicated area pastor Alistair Begg aired daily on both WHK and WHK-FM. In October 1997, both stations broadcast live from the "Stand in the Gap" rally held by Promise Keepers. In September 2000, WHK-FM joined Rock Contemporary Christian Radio Inc., a radio network airing contemporary Christian music.

2001 "frequency swap"

On July 3, 2001, WHK-FM was one of seven Northeast Ohio radio stations involved in a complex exchange between three radio companies. Although generally reported as a "frequency swap", in reality these seven radio stations mostly traded callsigns along with their respective formats and staffs – all to facilitate the transfers of ownership of four of the seven stations. As part of this complex exchange, Salem Communications sold WHK-FM to Clear Channel Communications; both companies retained their respective on- and off-air staff. Clear Channel then changed the WHK-FM callsign to WAKS; and changed the station's format to hot adult contemporary (hot AC). Less than one month later, on July 23, 2001, Clear Channel changed the station's callsign to WKDD. In effect, this new WKDD (98.1 FM) licensed to Canton became the successor to the previous WKDD (96.5 FM) licensed to Akron.

98.1 WKDD
On October 29, 2008, the station became licensed to the Akron suburb of Munroe Falls, Ohio. WKDD had a construction permit to return to the Akron area broadcast facility once occupied by its 96.5 FM predecessor, in Cuyahoga Falls, Ohio. On December 18, 2009, 30-year morning host Matt Patrick hosted his last show on WKDD. Longtime co-host Barbara "B.A." Adams returned to join Matt for his last show (Matt soon became the morning show host at WTRC and WTRC-FM in South Bend, Indiana and later worked at KTRH in Houston, Texas). After playing "Home" by Michael Bublé, the new morning show "Keith & Krissy" was announced, hosted by WKDD Programming Operations Director Keith Kennedy, and Patrick's former co-host, Krissy Taylor. The station also changed their on-air branding at this time to "Akron's 98-1 The New WKDD" with the slogan "Akron's Hit Music Station."

Each February since 2000, WKDD teams up with Akron Children's Hospital for the "Have a Heart, Do Your Part Radiothon" to benefit the hospital. Radiothon airs live on WKDD all weekend long. The event was hosted for many years by Matt Patrick and Barbara Adams, and later by Angela, Keith and Krissy.

On September 7, 2010, WKDD moved its signal back to its Cuyahoga Falls broadcast location, formerly used by the station in their 96.5 days, to improve the quality of its signal in the Akron area, especially northern Summit County. The station also adopted a slightly new format playing music from "the '90s, 2k and Today", however some 1980's songs are also in the playlist. In early 2012, WKDD gradually moved to a pop/contemporary hit radio (CHR) format.

Programming
Local personalities on WKDD included Keith Kennedy and "Captain" Tony McGinty; the majority of other programming is devoted to music, much of which is provided by iHeartMedia's internal Premium Choice network. American Top 40, syndicated via Premiere Networks, airs Sunday mornings.

Translators 
WKDD's second HD Radio subchannel, which simulcasts the Air1 network, is relayed over four low-power translators in both the Akron and Cleveland markets:

References

External links

1961 establishments in Ohio
IHeartMedia radio stations
Hot adult contemporary radio stations in the United States
Adult top 40 radio stations in the United States
Radio stations established in 1961
KDD